Bumbarash is a 1971 Soviet adventure film, a musical comedy in two episodes loosely based on some early works and the novel Bumbarash by Arkady Gaidar.

Plot
During the Russian Civil War, former Imperial Russian Army Private Bumbarash, formerly a prisoner of war in Austria, is returning to his home village, where all, including his beloved girlfriend, believe he is dead. Control of the village periodically changes between the Whites, Reds and "bandits". Bumbarash tries to survive in this chaos and to return to his love.

Cast
 Valeri Zolotukhin as Bumbarash
 Yekaterina Vasilyeva as Sofia Nikolayevna
 Yuri Smirnov as Gavrila
 Lev Durov as the Miller
 Roman Tkachuk as Commissar Zaplatin
 Natalya Dmitriyeva as Varvara
 Aleksandr Khochinsky as Lyovka Demchenko
 Aleksandra Belina as Yashka
 Leonid Bakshtayev as Chubatov
 Nikolay Dupak as Sovkov
 Margarita Krinitsyna as Seraphima
 Lev Perfilov as Melaniy, Bumbarash's brother
 Yuri Sherstnyov as episode
 Aleksandr Filippenko (cameo appearance)

References

External links
 

1971 films
1970s adventure comedy films
1970s historical adventure films
1970s musical comedy films
Soviet historical adventure films
Soviet musical comedy films
1970s Russian-language films
Russian Civil War films
Dovzhenko Film Studios films
1970s historical comedy films
Soviet historical musical films
1971 comedy films